Stoyanov Cove is the 2.6 km wide cove indenting for 1.1 km the north coast of Livingston Island in the South Shetland Islands, Antarctica.  Entered between Sandanski Point and Agüero Point on Ioannes Paulus II Peninsula.  Most of the cove's coastline is formed by the terminus of Urdoviza Glacier.

The cove is named after the Bulgarian scientist Velichko Stoyanov (1932–1999) for his support for the Bulgarian Antarctic programme.

Location
British mapping in 1968, Spanish in 1991, and Bulgarian in 2005 and 2009.

Maps
 L.L. Ivanov. Antarctica: Livingston Island and Greenwich, Robert, Snow and Smith Islands. Scale 1:120000 topographic map. Troyan: Manfred Wörner Foundation, 2010.  (First edition 2009. )
 Antarctic Digital Database (ADD). Scale 1:250000 topographic map of Antarctica. Scientific Committee on Antarctic Research (SCAR). Since 1993, regularly upgraded and updated.
 L.L. Ivanov. Antarctica: Livingston Island and Smith Island. Scale 1:100000 topographic map. Manfred Wörner Foundation, 2017.

References
 Bulgarian Antarctic Gazetteer. Antarctic Place-names Commission. (details in Bulgarian, basic data in English)
 Stoyanov Cove. SCAR Composite Antarctic Gazetteer

External links
 Stoyanov Cove. Copernix satellite image

Coves of Livingston Island
Bulgaria and the Antarctic